Deh Kian (also Romanized as Deh Kīān; also known as Kīān and Kīyān) is a village in Dehdez Rural District, Dehdez District, Izeh County, Khuzestan Province, Iran. At the 2006 census, its population was 784, in 132 families.

References 

Populated places in Izeh County